The 2001–02 season is CR Belouizdad's 37th season in the Algerian top flight, They will be competing in National 1, the Algerian Cup and the Champions League.

Squad list
Players and squad numbers last updated on 1 September 2001.Note: Flags indicate national team as has been defined under FIFA eligibility rules. Players may hold more than one non-FIFA nationality.

Competitions

Overview

{| class="wikitable" style="text-align: center"
|-
!rowspan=2|Competition
!colspan=8|Record
!rowspan=2|Started round
!rowspan=2|Final position / round
!rowspan=2|First match	
!rowspan=2|Last match
|-
!
!
!
!
!
!
!
!
|-
| National

|  
| 4th
| 30 August 2001
| 1 July 2002
|-
| Algerian Cup

| Round of 64
| Round of 16
| 14 March 2002
| 10 May 2002
|-
| 2001 Champions League

| colspan=2|Group Stage
| 12 August 2001
| 21 October 2001
|-
| 2002 Champions League

| colspan=2|First round
| 10 March 2002
| 24 March 2002
|-
! Total

National

League table

Results summary

Results by round

Matches

Algerian Cup

2001 Champions League

Group stage

Group B

2002 Champions League

First round

Squad information

Playing statistics

|-
! colspan=12 style=background:#dcdcdc; text-align:center| Goalkeepers

|-
! colspan=12 style=background:#dcdcdc; text-align:center| Defenders

|-
! colspan=12 style=background:#dcdcdc; text-align:center| Midfielders

|-
! colspan=12 style=background:#dcdcdc; text-align:center| Forwards

|-
! colspan=12 style=background:#dcdcdc; text-align:center| Players transferred out during the season

Goalscorers
Includes all competitive matches. The list is sorted alphabetically by surname when total goals are equal.

References

CR Belouizdad seasons
CR Belouizdad